The 1978 Tour de Suisse was the 42nd edition of the Tour de Suisse cycle race and was held from 14 June to 23 June 1978. The race started in Spreitenbach and finished in Affoltern. The race was won by Paul Wellens of the TI–Raleigh team.

General classification

References

1978
Tour de Suisse
1978 Super Prestige Pernod